Fábio Szymonek (born 11 May 1990), sometimes simply known as Fábio, is a Brazilian footballer who plays for Desportivo das Aves, as a goalkeeper.

Career
Born in Osasco, Szymonek was joined Palmeiras' youth categories in 2004, aged 15. After a loan stint with Juventus, he was promoted to the first-team squad in 2012, acting as a backup to Deola and Bruno.

On 4 October 2012, Szymonek signed a new five-year deal with Verdão, and played his first match as a professional on 12 November of the following year, as the club was already promoted, starting and playing the full 90 minutes in a 0–1 loss at Paysandu for the Série B championship.

In 2014, after Bruno's poor performances and Fernando Prass' injury, Szymonek was selected as Palmeiras' first-choice. On 28 June 2018, Szymonek signed with the Portuguese club Aves.

Personal life
Szymonek is of Polish descent through his father.

Honours
Palmeiras
Campeonato Brasileiro Série B: 2013
Copa do Brasil: 2015

References

External links
Palmeiras official profile 

1990 births
Living people
People from Osasco
Brazilian footballers
Brazilian people of Polish descent
Brazilian expatriate footballers
Association football goalkeepers
Campeonato Brasileiro Série A players
Campeonato Brasileiro Série B players
Primeira Liga players
Sociedade Esportiva Palmeiras players
Clube Atlético Juventus players
Oeste Futebol Clube players
Esporte Clube São Bento players
Esporte Clube Taubaté players
C.D. Aves players
Expatriate footballers in Portugal
Footballers from São Paulo (state)